Kentaro Fukuda (福田 健太郎, Fukuda Kentarō, born 27 July 1995) is a Japanese field hockey player for Gifu Asahi Club and the Japanese national team.

International career
Fukuda was a part of the Japan squad which won their first Asian Games gold medal in hockey in 2018. He represented Japan at the 2020 Summer Olympics.

References

External links
Tokyo 2020 profile

1995 births
Living people
Field hockey players at the 2018 Asian Games
Field hockey players at the 2020 Summer Olympics
Japanese male field hockey players
Male field hockey forwards
Olympic field hockey players of Japan
Sportspeople from Shimane Prefecture
Asian Games medalists in field hockey
Medalists at the 2018 Asian Games
Asian Games gold medalists for Japan
2023 Men's FIH Hockey World Cup players
21st-century Japanese people